Yu Peng Kean (born 8 May 1991 in Malacca, Malaysia) is a retired Malaysian fencer. At the 2012 Summer Olympics, he competed in the Men's sabre, but was defeated in the last 32 by Áron Szilágyi who went on to win gold medal in the event. Yu suffered a knee injury at the 2011 Southeast Asian Games (SEA Games) in Jakarta, with which he struggled for the remainder of his career. Following the 2012 Summer Olympics, he underwent anterior cruciate ligament reconstruction on both legs. He took bronze at the 2015 SEA Games after being defeated by Vũ Thành An of Vietnam, but re-injured his knee. He underwent surgery again, and planned to compete at the 2017 SEA Games with hopes of winning a silver or gold medal, but the condition of his knee continued to worsen, and he announced his retirement from fencing in February 2017. In December 2018, he married fellow Malaysian Olympian Leung Chii Lin. The couple's first child, a daughter, was born in September 2020.

References

Malaysian male sabre fencers
Living people
Malaysian people of Chinese descent
People from Malacca
Olympic fencers of Malaysia
Fencers at the 2012 Summer Olympics
Fencers at the 2010 Asian Games
1991 births
Southeast Asian Games medalists in fencing
Southeast Asian Games bronze medalists for Malaysia
Competitors at the 2015 Southeast Asian Games
Asian Games competitors for Malaysia